Sajjad Shahbazzadeh (born 23 January 1990) is an Iranian professional footballer who plays as a striker for Persian Gulf Pro League club Esteghlal.

Club career

Youth clubs
As a native of Ardabil, Shahbazzadeh started playing football as a child in Inter Campus of Ardabil, before moving to Zob Ahan Ardabil at the age of 14.

Saipa
Shahbazzadeh had played his entire career at Saipa from 2010 until 2014. In his last season with Saipa he scored 9 goals in all competition which lead him to move to the league giant Esteghlal.

Esteghlal

2014–15 Season
He signed for Esteghlal in summer 2014. He made his debut for Esteghlal in 2–1 win over Rah Ahan. His first goal for the club was the winning goal against Esteghlal Khuzestan. He played his first Tehran derby on 23 November in a 2–1 defeat which he scored Esteghlal's only goal of the match. On 4 February he played against his former team Saipa and scored the single goal of the match. He finished his first season with Esteghlal with 12 goals in the league which made him the runner-up in the season's Golden Boot, behind Éder Luciano.

2015–16 Season

Shahbazzzadeh scored a brace in the first game of the season against Siah jamegan which Esteghlal won 2–1. After 3 weeks of injury he scored his second goal in a 2–0 win against Gostaresh. He ended the season with 7 league goals and 4 goals in Hazfi Cup which made him the top scorer of the competition.

In summer of 2016 Shahbazzadeh announced he wanted to leave Esteghlal for a European team, however Esteghlal refused to let the player leave as he was still under contract with the club. After weeks of negotiations on 20 July 2016, he was finally released from Esteghlal.

Alanyaspor
On 22 July 2016, he officially joined the recently promoted club in Turkish Süper Lig. On 20 August he made his debut in a 4–1 loss against Beşiktaş J.K. entering as a substitute for Jonathan Ayité. On 26 August he started his first match for the club against Antalyaspor which Alanyaspor won 2–1. During his second start for the club on December 25, 2016, he scored his first goal for the club against Turkish giants Galatasaray.

Shahbazzadeh left the club in January 2017 after not receiving adequate playing time.

Naft Tehran
After failing to return to Esteghlal due to the club's transfer ban, Shahbazzadeh joined Naft Tehran during winter transfers. He scored Naft's winning goal against Tractor Sazi in Hazfi cup's final in May 2017.

Return to  Esteghlal
On 14 June, Shahbazzadeh Return to Esteghlal from Naft Tehran. Esteghlal's coach Alireza Mansourian had promised to keep the shirt number 10 vacant until Shahbazzadeh returns and upon his return, he was assigned the shirt number 10, as he was wearing it in his previous spell.

On 10 July 2017 during Esteghlal's pre-season, he played in a friendly against Pars Jonoubi Jam which he managed to score. He played his first official league match on 28 June 2017, in Esteghlal's opening match of the season, which they lost 1–0 against Sanat Naft. On 17 August 2017, Shahbazzadeh suffered a knee injury in a 1–0 defeat against Saipa. He returned in action against Foolad on 13 October. Due to consecutive injuries, fell behind fellow striker Ali Ghorbani and new Esteghlal coach Winfried Schäfer asked him to search for a new club for the rest of 2017–18 season. On 14 January 2018, he officially terminated his contract with the club.

Qatar SC
On 17 January 2018, Shahbazzadeh signed with Qatari side Qatar SC. Two days later, he was included in the starting line up against Al-Markhiya in which assisted Patrick Fabiano's single goal of the match. However his contract was terminated by the club 13 days after signing for them and Luis Antonio Jiménez replaced him in the squad. The reason for contract termination was due to the continues injuries he was dealing earlier in the season.

Sepahan
On 30 May 2018, Shahbazzadeh returned to Iran joining  Sepahan where he reunited with his former coach Amir Ghalenoei. On 27 July, he made his debut against Sanat Naft. A week later he opened his scoring tally with a brace against Sepidrood, with the team winning 6–1 away from home.

Shahbazzadeh finished the 2020–21 season as the top scorer of the league with 20 goals.

Third spell at Esteghlal
On 26 June 2022, Esteghlal announced on their social media that Shahbazzadeh had rejoined the club.

Career statistics

Club

Honours

Club
Esteghlal
Hazfi Cup Runner-up: 2015–16
Iranian Super Cup (1): 2022

Naft Tehran
Hazfi Cup (1): 2016–17

Individual
Persian Gulf Pro League Top scorer: 2020–21
Persian Gulf Pro League Team of the Year: 2014–15
Hazfi Cup Top scorer: 2015–16

References

1990 births
Living people
People from Ardabil
Association football forwards
Saipa F.C. players
Esteghlal F.C. players
Naft Tehran F.C. players
Süper Lig players
Alanyaspor footballers
Qatar Stars League players
Qatar SC players
Persian Gulf Pro League players
Iranian footballers
Iranian expatriate footballers
Expatriate footballers in Turkey
Expatriate footballers in Qatar
Iranian expatriate sportspeople in Turkey
Iranian expatriate sportspeople in Qatar